Muzhappilangad (മുഴപ്പിലങ്ങാട്) is a coastal census town near Thalassery in Kannur district in the Indian state of Kerala. It is a suburb of kannur city

History
The Kolathunadu emerged into independent 10 principalities i.e., Kadathanadu (Vadakara), Randathara or Poyanad (Dharmadom), Kottayam (Thalassery), Nileshwaram, Iruvazhinadu (Panoor, Kurumbranad etc., under separate royal chieftains due to the outcome of internal dissensions. The Poyanad (Randaterra) of Dharmadom and a vast area of land(Anjarakkandy, Chembilod,Mavilayi, Edakkad, Dharmadam) upto New Mahe were ruled by of achanmaar of Randuthara. Randuthara Achanmār is a conglomerate of 4 Nambiār families (Kandoth, Palliyath, Āyilliath and Arayath) who were descendants of Edathil Kadāngodan and Ponnattil Māvila and were chieftains of Poyanādu.

In 1998, the Kerala Government took over this land for tourism development. Dharmadam is located 4 km from the town of Thalassery. "Achanmar's" later came under the special care of the English East India Company.  The Nileshwaram dynasty on the northernmost part of Kolathiri dominion, were relatives to both Kolathunadu as well as the Zamorin of Calicut, in the early medieval period. "Achanmar's" later came under the special care of the English East India Company.

Tourist attractions

This village is renowned for its 3.4 km long pristine Muzhappilangad beach.  Dharmadam island (Pacha Thuruth) is visible from here and Anjarakandy river enters in Arabian sea near this place.

Access
The nearest town to Muzhappilangad is the town of Tellichery now called Thalassery is 7 km away.  The District Headquarters Kannur is  13 km from Muzhappilangad.

Festivals
Muzhappilangad is famous for "Thalappoli", A three-day festival celebrated in March  at "Sree Koormba Temple". In this festival, devotees take Kalasham (a sacred brass receptacle) in a procession to the Temple to show their respect to the Goddess.

Demographics
 India census, Muzhappilangad had a population of 23,709. Males constitute 47% of the population and females 53%. Muzhappilangad has an average literacy rate of 83%, higher than the national average of 59.5%: male literacy is 84%, and female literacy is 83%. In Muzhappilangad, 12% of the population is under 6 years of age.

entegramam

See also
 Muzhappilangad Beach
 Thalassery
 Mangalore
 Dharmadam
 Dharmadam Island

References

External links 

Must See in Muzhappilangadu Beach

Thalassery road, Kannur